Pleurostylia opposita is a species of shrub in the family Celastraceae. It is distributed throughout the India, Indonesia, Malaysia, New Guinea, Philippines, Sri Lanka, Thailand, Vietnam, Australia and China.

References

External links
 
 
Biotik.org

Celastraceae
Flora of tropical Asia
Flora of Australia